The Mouse Factory is an American syndicated television series produced by Walt Disney Productions and created by Ward Kimball, that ran from 1972 to 1973. It showed clips from various Disney cartoons and movies, hosted by celebrity guests (credited as being "Mickey's Friend"), including Charles Nelson Reilly, JoAnne Worley, Wally Cox, Johnny Brown, Phyllis Diller, Joe Flynn, Annette Funicello, Shari Lewis and Hush Puppy, Lamb Chop, Dom DeLuise, Don Knotts and many more visiting the Mouse Factory and interacting with the walk-around Disney characters from the Disney theme parks. The series was later rerun on the Disney Channel in the 1980s and 1990s.

The theme played over the previews of each episode was a fast instrumental version of "Whistle While You Work" from Snow White and the Seven Dwarfs.

To start the ending credits, it shows Mickey Mouse in a biplane, flying across the screen carrying a banner than reads " the end". A large ape, resembling King Kong, promptly swipes said plane as well as Mickey out of thin air, dropping them in his mouth and devouring them. In season 2, this was changed to Donald Duck uttering the phrase "it won't work".

The song played over the end credits is "Minnie's Yoo Hoo", the theme song from the original Mickey Mouse Clubs that met in theaters starting in 1929. The version used in the series originated in a 1968 episode of The Wonderful World of Disney celebrating Mickey's birthday.

Due to low ratings and limited distribution, the series was cancelled after its second season.

Premise 
The Mouse Factory mixes live-action with animation and features a different theme in each episode. Each episode is hosted by a celebrity guest, who plays a new character and interacts with Disney characters such as Mickey, Donald, Goofy and Pluto (appearing in costume form as they do in theme parks), among others. In addition, each episode features several classic short films and clips of feature films (about three short films and clips in each episode).

Records 
Disneyland Records released two vinyl 12-inch LP records and three seven-inch 33 1/3 rpm to tie in with series, all containing previously released recordings and no new soundtrack material from the TV show. The Mouse Factory Presents Mickey and His Friends was an LP compilation of songs and sketches. Stories and Songs from The Mouse Factory contained four edited "read-along" recordings of tales seen on the show. The three seven-inch records each presented four songs featuring Mickey Mouse, Donald Duck and Goofy.

List of episodes
43 episodes were produced, including:

Season 1 (1972)

Season 2 (1972-1973)

References

External links
 
 

1970s American animated television series
1970s American anthology television series
1972 American television series debuts
1974 American television series endings
American children's animated anthology television series
American television series with live action and animation
English-language television shows
First-run syndicated television programs in the United States
Disney Channel original programming
Mickey Mouse television series
Television series by Disney